Daniela Caram (born 24 November 1986) is a former Chilean field hockey player.

Personal life
Caram's younger sister, Camila, also represents the Chile national team, and is their current captain.

Career

Junior National Team
Caram made her debut for the Chile junior national team in 2005. First at the 2005 Pan-American Junior Championship, which served as a qualifier for the Junior World Cup in Santiago.

Caram again represented Chile at the Junior World Cup, where the team finished in 10th place.

Senior National Team
Caram debuted for the senior national team in 2005.

Her first major tournament with the team being the 2006 South American Games. The team won a silver medal in the inaugural field hockey tournament at the South American Games.

Following her debut, Caram represented Chile up until 2015, retiring after the 2015 Pan American Games.

Following the Pan American Games, Caram was named in the 2015 Pan American Elite Team for the first time by the Pan American Hockey Federation.

References

1986 births
Living people
Chilean female field hockey players
South American Games silver medalists for Chile
South American Games medalists in field hockey
Pan American Games medalists in field hockey
Pan American Games bronze medalists for Chile
Field hockey players at the 2011 Pan American Games
Competitors at the 2006 South American Games
Competitors at the 2014 South American Games
Medalists at the 2011 Pan American Games
20th-century Chilean women
21st-century Chilean women